The Boot is a public house in St Albans, Hertfordshire, UK.
Located in the centre of the city, it is near the site of the First Battle of St Albans.

According to St Albans Ghost Lore [Muriel Thresher and Beryl Carrington (1987)  published by St Albans and Hertfordshire Archaeological Society], it was known as the Old Wellington pub formerly the Blue Boar .

Architecture 

The pub appears to consist of two separate buildings joined together. The building dates to around 1500, and is a grade II listed with Historic England.

References

External links 

Pubs in St Albans
Grade II listed pubs in Hertfordshire
Timber framed buildings in Hertfordshire